Walter Blattmann (10 June 1910 – 1 October 1965) was a Swiss racing cyclist. He rode in the 1933 Tour de France and finished 9th overall in the 1935 Vuelta a España. He also won the 1933 Züri-Metzgete.

Major results
1933
 1st  National Cyclo-cross Championships
 1st Züri-Metzgete
 2nd Overall Circuit de la Haute-Savoie
 9th Overall Tour de Suisse
1934
 1st Tour du Nord-Ouest
 1st Tour du Lac Léman
1935
 9th Overall Vuelta a España
1936
 4th Overall Tour de Suisse
1937
 3rd Overall Tour de Suisse

References

1910 births
1965 deaths
Swiss male cyclists
Cyclists from Zürich